Hatsuko Hirose-Kawai (born 9 February 1937) is a Japanese diver. She competed at the 1956 Summer Olympics and the 1964 Summer Olympics.

References

External links
 

1937 births
Living people
Japanese female divers
Olympic divers of Japan
Divers at the 1956 Summer Olympics
Divers at the 1964 Summer Olympics
Place of birth missing (living people)
20th-century Japanese women